Soazig Aaron (born 1949, Rennes) is a French author.

Biography 
After studying history, Soazig Aaron worked for a few years in a bookshop in Paris. Today, she lives in Rennes in Brittany.

Her first novel, Le Non de Klara, appeared in 2002. The author, who is not Jewish, recounts in a fictitious diary the fate of Klara, a survivor of Auschwitz who returned in 1945 to Paris, trying to resume a normal life.

For this work, Soazig Aaron received the prix Goncourt du premier roman and the prix Emmanuel Roblès of the city of Blois in 2002. These two prizes reward a first novel. In 2002, it also obtained the Prix du Roman of the city of Carhaix. In 2004, Le Non de Klara was crowned with the Grand Prix des Libraires. In Germany, the novel was awarded the Geschwister-Scholl-Preis.

Her second novel, La Sentinelle tranquille sous la lune, was published by éditions Gallimard in 2010.

Works 
2002: Le Non de Klara, éditions Maurice Nadeau, 
2010: La Sentinelle tranquille sous la lune, Gallimard

References

External links 
 Soazig Aaron on Babelio
 Soazig AARON, Le non de Klara
 Le beau roman de Soazig Aaron on Bibliobs (30 March 2010)

1949 births
Writers from Rennes
21st-century French novelists
Prix Goncourt du Premier Roman recipients
Prix Emmanuel Roblès recipients
Living people
21st-century French women writers